Striospira is a genus of sea snails, marine gastropod mollusks in the family Pseudomelatomidae, the turrids and allies.

Species brought into synonymy
 Striospira lucasensis Bartsch, 1950: synonym of Crassispira kluthi Jordan, 1936

References

External links
 ^Bouchet, P.; Kantor, Y. I.; Sysoev, A.; Puillandre, N. (2011). A new operational classification of the Conoidea (Gastropoda). Journal of Molluscan Studies. 77(3): 273-308

Pseudomelatomidae